Shawmut is a census-designated place and unincorporated community in Wheatland County, Montana, United States. Its population was 42 as of the 2010 census. Shawmut has a post office with ZIP code 59078, which opened on October 27, 1885. The community is located along U.S. Route 12 and Montana Highway 3.

Demographics

Education
It is zoned to Harlowton Public Schools.

References

Census-designated places in Wheatland County, Montana
Census-designated places in Montana